Seven Mile Beach is a long beach with strong historical reference just south of Gerringong in the Shoalhaven area of New South Wales, Australia.

History
In 1933 Seven Mile Beach was used by Sir Charles Kingsford Smith as the runway for the first commercial flight between Australia and New Zealand.

Flora
The area contains a unique littoral rainforest with several rainforest plants at their southernmost limit of distribution, as well as a beach/dune/wetland ecosystem and has been used for studying sand dunes and their vegetation. Surrounding the beach are spinifex, coast wattle, tea-tree, coast banksia, she-oaks, saw banksia, southern mahogany or bangalay, and burrawangs. It also has a little river/lake.

Fauna
Its bird population includes honeyeaters, currawongs, crimson rosellas, thornbills, kookaburras, ravens, grey fantails, eastern whipbirds and white-throated treecreepoers, and even white-breasted sea eagles.

Gallery

See also
 Seven Mile Beach National Park

References

Beaches of New South Wales